David Ring (born 28 October 1953) is a Christian evangelist and motivational speaker who has cerebral palsy. Ring has, since 1973, challenged thousands of people with his signature message: "I have cerebral palsy... What's your problem?" He currently resides in Nashville, Tennessee, with his wife and four children.

Early years
David Ring was born in Jonesboro, the seat of Craighead County in eastern Arkansas, the son of Baptist pastor Oscar Newton Ring. Ring's father died in 1964. Cancer took his mother four years later. Ring was hence an orphan at the age of fourteen. Depressed from the combination of losing his parents and the difficulties of his disability, Ring dropped out of high school. Ring specifically struggled with losing his mother, the only woman he believed would love him. According to Ring, he attempted to commit suicide many times over the course of the following two years due to his depression. With the encouragement of his sister, however, he gave his life to Jesus in 1970 and returned to Liberty High School in Liberty, Missouri, where he graduated in 1971. Ring earned a Bachelor of Arts degree from William Jewell College in Liberty in 1976, where he was a member of Lambda Chi Alpha fraternity.
His new signature message is "I have cerebral palsy, but cerebral palsy don't have me."  His now famous catch phrase (concerning Christians who make excuses regarding their faith) is:  "I have cerebal palsy and I serve the Lord with all that is within me, what's your excuse?"

Ministry
Ring has been a guest on The Old-Time Gospel Hour, The 700 Club, and at Bill Gaither's Praise Gathering. He has written one book Just As I Am: The Life of David Ring in 1994. Ring describes gospel musician Mike Speck as his "best friend in the whole world". Ring has been featured on broadcasts such as John Hagee’s ministry Cornerstone and James Dobson’s Focus on the Family.

References

External links
David Ring's Home Page
The Best Motivator Official Page

1953 births
Living people
20th-century Christians
21st-century Christians
American evangelists
American motivational speakers
American people with disabilities
People from Nashville, Tennessee
People with cerebral palsy
William Jewell College alumni
People from Jonesboro, Arkansas